Sizinkiler (Limon & Zeytin) (literally, "Your People), was a daily newspaper comic strip created by the Turkish cartoonist Salih Memecan in 1991. The name of the newspaper comic strip was called Limon(lemon in Turkish)and Zeytin (olive in Turkish) but when they stopped creating them in newspapers Salih Memecan started making books that had 2 comic strips on a page and named the books Sizinkiler". The strip is based on family-related issues and the dynamics of everyday family life. Sizinkiler has an animated adaption and over 31 books

External links
Sizinkiler website

 Turkish comic strips